The 2019–20 Chicago Bulls season was the 54th season of the franchise in the National Basketball Association (NBA).

The season was suspended by the league officials following the games of March 11 after it was reported that Rudy Gobert tested positive for COVID-19. On June 4, 2020, the season came to an end for the Bulls when the NBA Board of Governors approved a plan that would restart the season with 22 teams returning to play in the NBA Bubble on July 31, 2020, which was approved by the National Basketball Players Association the next day.

Boylen was later fired as head coach on August 14, 2020.

Draft picks

The Bulls hold a lottery first round pick and a second round pick. At the night of the draft lottery, the Bulls fell to #7, the furthest a team with the fourth-best odds had fallen in the NBA draft lottery. With the seventh pick of the draft, Chicago selected point guard Coby White from the University of North Carolina.

Roster

Standings

Division

Conference

Game log

Preseason
The preseason schedule was announced on July 23, 2019.

|- style="background:#fcc;"
| 1
| October 7
| Milwaukee
| 
| Zach LaVine (16)
| Tomáš Satoranský (7)
| Zach LaVine (10)
| United Center17,036
| 0–1
|- style="background:#fcc;"
| 2
| October 9
| New Orleans
| 
| Zach LaVine (28)
| Otto Porter (7)
| Satoranský, Porter (8)
| United Center18,670
| 0–2
|- style="background:#fcc;"
| 3
| October 11
| @ Indiana
| 
| Coby White (24)
| Coby White (8)
| Ryan Arcidiacono (4)
| Bankers Life Fieldhouse10,821
| 0–3
|- style="background:#cfc;"
| 4
| October 13
| @ Toronto
| 
| Zach LaVine (26)
| Lauri Markkanen (13)
| LaVine, Satoranský, Arcidiacono, Dunn (4)
| Scotiabank Arena16,438
| 1–3
|- style="background:#cfc;"
| 5
| October 17
| Atlanta
| 
| Zach LaVine (23)
| Lauri Markkanen (11)
| Satoranský, Arcidiacono (4)
| United Center18,277
| 2–3

Regular season

|- style="background:#fcc;"
| 1
| October 23
| @ Charlotte
| 
| Lauri Markkanen (35)
| Lauri Markkanen (17)
| Zach LaVine (7)
| Spectrum Center15,424
| 0–1
|- style="background:#cfc;"
| 2
| October 25
| @ Memphis
| 
| Zach LaVine (37)
| Lauri Markkanen (11)
| LaVine, Dunn (4)
| FedExForum17,794
| 1–1
|- style="background:#fcc;"
| 3
| October 26
| Toronto
| 
| Wendell Carter Jr. (12)
| Wendell Carter Jr. (11)
| LaVine, Satoransky, Arcidiacono (4)
| United Center21,498
| 1–2
|- style="background:#fcc;"
| 4
| October 28
| @ New York
| 
| Zach LaVine (21)
| Wendell Carter Jr. (10)
| Tomas Satoransky (5)
| Madison Square Garden21,498
| 1–3
|- style="background:#fcc;"
| 5
| October 30
| @ Cleveland
| 
| LaVine, Markkanen (16)
| Lauri Markkanen (8)
| Tomas Satoransky (8)
| Rocket Mortgage FieldHouse17,595
| 1–4

|- style="background:#cfc;"
| 6
| November 1
| Detroit
| 
| Zach LaVine (26)
| Wendell Carter Jr. (11)
| Tomas Satoransky (6)
| United Center20,671
| 2–4
|- style="background:#fcc;"
| 7
| November 3
| @ Indiana
| 
| Zach LaVine (21)
| Wendell Carter Jr. (10)
| Tomas Satoransky (9)
| Bankers Life Fieldhouse17,073
| 2–5
|- style="background:#fcc;"
| 8
| November 5
| L. A. Lakers
| 
| Zach LaVine (26)
| Wendell Carter Jr. (11)
| Zach LaVine (7)
| United Center21,193
| 2–6
|- style="background:#cfc;"
| 9
| November 6
| @ Atlanta
| 
| Tomas Satoransky (27)
| Zach LaVine (8)
| Tomas Satoransky (8)
| State Farm Arena15,049
| 3–6
|- style="background:#fcc;"
| 10
| November 9
| Houston
| 
| Young, Hutchison, Markkanen, Carter Jr. (13)
| Wendell Carter Jr. (16)
| Zach LaVine (5)
| United Center20,482
| 3–7
|- style="background:#cfc;"
| 11
| November 12
| New York
| 
| Coby White (27)
| Wendell Carter Jr. (12)
| Ryan Arcidiacono (8)
| United Center18,668
| 4–7
|- style="background:#fcc;"
| 12
| November 14
| @ Milwaukee
| 
| Coby White (26)
| Lauri Markkanen (8)
| Zach LaVine (7)
| Fiserv Forum17,627
| 4–8
|- style="background:#fcc;"
| 13
| November 16
| Brooklyn
| 
| Zach LaVine (36)
| Wendell Carter Jr. (14)
| Coby White (3)
| United Center19,148
| 4–9
|- style="background:#fcc;"
| 14
| November 18
| Milwaukee
| 
| Daniel Gafford (21)
| Carter Jr., LaVine, Markkanen (8)
| Kris Dunn (9)
| United Center17,565
| 4–10
|- style="background:#cfc;"
| 15
| November 20
| Detroit
| 
| Lauri Markkanen (24)
| Wendell Carter Jr. (15)
| Tomas Satoransky (7)
| United Center18,119
| 5–10
|- style="background:#fcc;"
| 16
| November 22
| Miami
| 
| Zach LaVine (15)
| Thaddeus Young (8)
| Satoransky, Dunn (5)
| United Center18,953
| 5–11
|- style="background:#cfc;"
| 17
| November 23
| @ Charlotte
| 
| Zach LaVine (49)
| Wendell Carter Jr. (11)
| Tomas Satoransky (8)
| Spectrum Center17,891
| 6–11
|- style="background:#fcc;"
| 18
| November 25
| Portland
| 
| Zach LaVine (18)
| Wendell Carter Jr. (9)
| Satoransky, LaVine (5)
| United Center18,776
| 6–12
|- style="background:#fcc;"
| 19
| November 27
| @ Golden State
| 
| Zach LaVine (36)
| Wendell Carter Jr. (9)
| Tomáš Satoranský (7)
| Chase Center18,064
| 6–13
|- style="background:#fcc;"
| 20
| November 29
| @ Portland
| 
| Zach LaVine (28)
| Young, Carter Jr. (9)
| Tomáš Satoranský (8)
| Moda Center20,139
| 6–14

|- style="background:#cfc;"
| 21
| December 2
| @ Sacramento
| 
| Zach LaVine (28)
| Wendell Carter Jr. (10)
| Tomáš Satoranský (5)
| Golden 1 Center17,257
| 7–14
|- style="background:#cfc;"
| 22
| December 4
| Memphis
| 
| Zach LaVine (25)
| Wendell Carter Jr. (13)
| Tomáš Satoranský (8)
| United Center15,017
| 8–14
|- style="background:#fcc;"
| 23
| December 6
| Golden State
| 
| Zach LaVine (22)
| Wendell Carter Jr. (12)
| Zach LaVine (6)
| United Center18,841
| 8–15
|- style="background:#fcc;"
| 24
| December 8
| @ Miami
| 
| Lauri Markkanen (22)
| Wendell Carter Jr. (10)
| Coby White (8)
| American Airlines Arena19,600
| 8–16
|- style="background:#fcc;"
| 25
| December 9
| Toronto
| 
| Zach LaVine (20)
| Zach LaVine (11)
| Tomáš Satoranský (11)
| United Center14,775
| 8–17
|- style="background:#cfc;"
| 26
| December 11
| Atlanta
| 
| Zach LaVine (35)
| Wendell Carter Jr. (10)
| Thaddeus Young (6)
| United Center15,084
| 9–17
|- style="background:#fcc;"
| 27
| December 13
| Charlotte
| 
| Arcidiacono, LaVine (12)
| Wendell Carter Jr. (11)
| Satoransky, Dunn, White (3)
| United Center18,377
| 9–18
|- style="background:#cfc;"
| 28
| December 14
| L. A. Clippers
| 
| Zach LaVine (31)
| Lauri Markkanen (17)
| Tomáš Satoranský (5)
| United Center18,426
| 10–18
|- style="background:#fcc;"
| 29
| December 16
| @ Oklahoma City
| 
| Zach LaVine (39)
| Wendell Carter Jr. (9)
| Tomáš Satoranský (6)
| Chesapeake Energy Arena18,203
| 10–19
|- style="background:#cfc;"
| 30
| December 18
| @ Washington
| 
| Lauri Markkanen (31)
| Markkanen, Carter Jr., Young (9)
| Tomáš Satoranský (6)
| Capital One Arena14,987
| 11–19
|- style="background:#cfc;"
| 31
| December 21
| @ Detroit
| 
| Zach LaVine (33)
| Wendell Carter Jr. (12)
| Satoransky, LaVine (5)
| Little Caesars Arena15,948
| 12–19
|- style="background:#fcc;"
| 32
| December 23
| @ Orlando
| 
| Zach LaVine (26)
| Wendell Carter Jr. (10)
| Kris Dunn (6)
| Amway Center18,846
| 12–20
|- style="background:#cfc;"
| 33
| December 28
| Atlanta
| 
| Lauri Markkanen (25)
| Carter Jr., Satoransky (8)
| Tomáš Satoranský (6)
| United Center21,496
| 13–20
|- style="background:#fcc;"
| 34
| December 30
| Milwaukee
| 
| Zach LaVine (19)
| Wendell Carter Jr. (11)
| Tomáš Satoranský (7)
| United Center21,954
| 13–21

|- style="background:#fcc;"
| 35
| January 2
| Utah
| 
| Zach LaVine (26)
| Wendell Carter Jr. (13)
| Zach LaVine (5)
| United Center19,398
| 13–22
|- style="background:#fcc;"
| 36
| January 4
| Boston
| 
| Zach LaVine (35)
| Wendell Carter Jr. (14)
| Kris Dunn (7)
| United Center21,130
| 13–23
|- style="background:#fcc;"
| 37
| January 6
| @ Dallas
| 
| Lauri Markkanen (26)
| Markkanen, Young (9)
| Tomáš Satoranský (14)
| American Airlines Center20,238
| 13–24
|- style="background:#fcc;"
| 38
| January 8
| @ New Orleans
| 
| Zach LaVine (32)
| White, Young (6)
| Kris Dunn (7)
| Smoothie King Center15,324
| 13–25
|- style="background:#fcc;"
| 39
| January 10
| Indiana
| 
| Zach LaVine (43)
| Thaddeus Young (9)
| Lauri Markkanen (4)
| United Center20,229
| 13–26
|- style="background:#cfc;"
| 40
| January 11
| @ Detroit
| 
| Zach LaVine (25)
| Markkanen, Gafford (7)
| Zach LaVine (6)
| Little Caesars Arena15,951
| 14–26
|- style="background:#fcc;"
| 41
| January 13
| @ Boston
| 
| Zach LaVine (30)
| Lauri Markkanen (6)
| Tomáš Satoranský (7)
| TD Garden19,156
| 14–27
|- style="background:#cfc;"
| 42
| January 15
| Washington
| 
| Zach LaVine (30)
| Markkanen, Young (8)
| Dunn, LaVine (7)
| United Center19,382
| 15–27
|- style="background:#fcc;"
| 43
| January 17
| @ Philadelphia
| 
| Zach LaVine (23)
| Zach LaVine (7)
| Tomáš Satoranský (6)
| Wells Fargo Center20,919
| 15–28
|- style="background:#cfc;"
| 44
| January 18
| Cleveland
| 
| Zach LaVine (42)
| Zach LaVine (6)
| Tomáš Satoranský (8)
| United Center19,939
| 16–28
|- style="background:#fcc;"
| 45
| January 20
| @ Milwaukee
| 
| Zach LaVine (24)
| Lauri Markkanen (8)
| Tomáš Satoranský (4)
| Fiserv Forum17,747
| 16–29
|- style="background:#cfc;"
| 46
| January 22
| Minnesota
| 
| Zach LaVine (25)
| Cristiano Felício (10)
| Tomáš Satoranský (5)
| United Center18,875
| 17–29
|- style="background:#fcc;"
| 47
| January 24
| Sacramento
| 
| Zach LaVine (21)
| Cristiano Felício (9)
| Kris Dunn (6)
| United Center17,661
| 17–30
|- style="background:#cfc;"
| 48
| January 25
| @ Cleveland
| 
| Zach LaVine (44)
| Zach LaVine (10)
| Zach LaVine (8)
| Rocket Mortgage FieldHouse19,432
| 18–30
|- style="background:#cfc;"
| 49
| January 27
| San Antonio
| 
| Zach LaVine (23)
| Kornet, Young (9)
| Kris Dunn (8)
| United Center16,071
| 19–30
|- style="background:#fcc;"
| 50
| January 29
| @ Indiana
| 
| Chandler Hutchison (21)
| Cristiano Felício (8)
| Zach LaVine (9)
| Bankers Life Fieldhouse17,923
| 19–31
|- style="background:#fcc;"
| 51
| January 31
| @ Brooklyn
| 
| Zach LaVine (22)
| Chandler Hutchison (9)
| LaVine, Satoranský (8)
| Barclays Center17,732
| 19–32

|- style="background:#fcc;"
| 52
| February 2
| @ Toronto
| 
| Thaddeus Young (21)
| LaVine, Young (7)
| Zach LaVine (7)
| Scotiabank Arena19,800
| 19–33
|- style="background:#fcc;"
| 53
| February 6
| New Orleans
| 
| Zach LaVine (22)
| Chandler Hutchison (8)
| Coby White (9)
| United Center18,247
| 19–34
|- style="background:#fcc;"
| 54
| February 9
| @ Philadelphia
| 
| Zach LaVine (32)
| Thaddeus Young (10)
| Zach LaVine (8)
| Wells Fargo Center21,018
| 19–35
|- style="background:#fcc;"
| 55
| February 11
| @ Washington
| 
| Zach LaVine (41)
| Zach LaVine (9)
| Tomáš Satoranský (8)
| Capital One Arena15,135
| 19–36
|- style="background:#fcc;"
| 56
| February 20
| Charlotte
| 
| Thaddeus Young (22)
| Thaddeus Young (11)
| Tomáš Satoranský (8)
| United Center17,463
| 19–37
|- style="background:#fcc;"
| 57
| February 22
| Phoenix
| 
| Coby White (33)
| Felício, Satoranský (6)
| Zach LaVine (5)
| United Center20,506
| 19–38
|- style="background:#cfc;"
| 58
| February 23
| Washington
| 
| Coby White (33)
| Felício, White, Young (6)
| Tomáš Satoranský (13)
| United Center18,024
| 20–38
|- style="background:#fcc;"
| 59
| February 25
| Oklahoma City
| 
| Zach LaVine (41)
| Cristiano Felício (9)
| Tomáš Satoranský (7)
| United Center16,911
| 20–39
|- style="background:#fcc;"
| 60
| February 29
| @ New York
| 
| Zach LaVine (26)
| Wendell Carter Jr. (9)
| LaVine, Satoranský (7)
| Madison Square Garden19,812
| 20–40

|- style="background:#cfc;"
| 61
| March 2
| Dallas
| 
| Coby White (19)
| Thaddeus Young (9)
| Satoranský, White (5)
| United Center18,407
| 21–40
|- style="background:#fcc;"
| 62
| March 4
| @ Minnesota
| 
| Coby White (26)
| Wendell Carter Jr. (9)
| Coby White (6)
| Target Center13,392
| 21–41
|- style="background:#fcc;"
| 63
| March 6
| Indiana
| 
| Coby White (26)
| Satoranský, Young (7)
| Tomáš Satoranský (8)
| United Center20,229
| 21–42
|- style="background:#fcc;"
| 64
| March 8
| @ Brooklyn
| 
| Otto Porter (23)
| Shaquille Harrison (8)
| Coby White (8)
| Barclays Center15,916
| 21–43
|- style="background:#cfc;"
| 65
| March 10
| Cleveland
| 
| Coby White (20)
| Shaquille Harrison (10)
| Satoranský, White (5)
| United Center17,837
| 22–43

|- style="background:#;"
| 66
| March 12
| @ Orlando
| 
|
|
|
| Amway Center
|
|- style="background:#;"
| 67
| March 14
| @ Miami
| 
|
|
|
| American Airlines Arena
|
|- style="background:#;"
| 68
| March 15
| Boston
| 
|
|
|
| United Center
|
|- style="background:#;"
| 69
| March 18
| Miami
| 
|
|
|
| United Center
|
|- style="background:#;"
| 70
| March 20
| @ San Antonio
| 
|
|
|
| AT&T Center
|
|- style="background:#;"
| 71
| March 21
| @ Houston
| 
|
|
|
| Toyota Center
|
|- style="background:#;"
| 72
| March 23
| Denver
| 
|
|
|
| United Center
|
|- style="background:#;"
| 73
| March 26
| Philadelphia
| 
|
|
|
| United Center
|
|- style="background:#;"
| 74
| March 28
| New York
| 
|
|
|
| United Center
|
|- style="background:#;"
| 75
| March 30
| @ Utah
| 
|
|
|
| Vivint Smart Home Arena
|
|- style="background:#;"
| 76
| April 3
| @ Denver
| 
|
|
|
| Pepsi Center
|
|- style="background:#;"
| 77
| April 5
| @ Phoenix
| 
|
|
|
| Talking Stick Resort Arena
|
|- style="background:#;"
| 78
| April 6
| @ LA Clippers
| 
|
|
|
| Staples Center
|- style="background:#;"
| 79
| April 8
| @ LA Lakers
| 
|
|
|
| Staples Center
|
|- style="background:#;"
| 80
| April 11
| Brooklyn
| 
|
|
|
| United Center
|
|- style="background:#;"
| 81
| April 13
| Orlando
| 
|
|
|
| United Center
|
|- style="background:#;"
| 82
| April 15
| @ Boston
| 
|
|
|
| TD Garden
|

Player statistics

|-
| align="left"| || align="center"| PG
| 58 || 4 || 930 || 110 || 96 || 27 || 3 || 261
|-
| align="left"| || align="center"| C
| 43 || 43 || 1,256 || style=";"|405 || 51 || 33 || 36 || 484
|-
| align="left"| || align="center"| PG
| 51 || 32 || 1,269 || 186 || 173 || style=";"|101 || 17 || 373
|-
| align="left"| || align="center"| C
| 22 || 0 || 386 || 102 || 16 || 10 || 2 || 86
|-
| align="left"| || align="center"| C
| 43 || 7 || 609 || 106 || 21 || 13 || style=";"|56 || 220
|-
| align="left"| || align="center"| PG
| 43 || 10 || 484 || 86 || 49 || 34 || 19 || 209
|-
| align="left"| || align="center"| SF
| 28 || 10 || 527 || 108 || 26 || 27 || 7 || 218
|-
| align="left"| || align="center"| PF/C
| 36 || 14 || 559 || 84 || 32 || 11 || 26 || 215
|-
| align="left"| || align="center"| SG
| 60 || 60 || style=";"|2,085 || 289 || 254 || 88 || 28 || style=";"|1,530
|-
| align="left"| || align="center"| PF
| 50 || 50 || 1,492 || 313 || 74 || 42 || 23 || 737
|-
| align="left"| || align="center"| SG/SF
| 11 || 0 || 112 || 10 || 4 || 4 || 0 || 32
|-
| align="left"| || align="center"| SF
| 14 || 9 || 331 || 48 || 25 || 15 || 6 || 167
|-
| align="left"| || align="center"| PG
| style=";"|65 || style=";"|64 || 1,878 || 254 || style=";"|354 || 80 || 7 || 644
|-
| align="left"| || align="center"| SF
| 2 || 0 || 6 || 1 || 0 || 0 || 0 || 5
|-
| align="left"| || align="center"| SG/SF
| 36 || 5 || 488 || 74 || 43 || 26 || 6 || 246
|-
| align="left"| || align="center"| PG
| style=";"|65 || 1 || 1,674 || 230 || 175 || 49 || 6 || 859
|-
| align="left"| || align="center"| PF
| 64 || 16 || 1,591 || 315 || 117 || 92 || 23 || 659
|}
After all games.
‡Waived during the season
†Traded during the season
≠Acquired during the season

References

2019-20
2019–20 NBA season by team
2019 in sports in Illinois
Bulls
Bulls
Bulls
Bulls